Tatyana Aleksandrovna Sidorova (born 25 July 1936) is a Russian speed skater who competed for the Soviet Union in the 1964 and 1968 Winter Olympics. In 1964 she won the bronze medal in the 500 m event. Four years later she finished ninth in the 500 m competition.

She set three world records in 500 m, one in 1968 and two in 1970, and won three Soviet titles, in 500 m (1968, 1970) and 1,000 m (1966) events. After retiring from senior skating she competed in the masters category, winning Russian titles in 1997–2000 and a world title in 2001.

Personal bests:
500 m – 42.8 (1973)
1000 m – 1:29.9 (1970)
1500 m – 2:21.8 (1970)
3000 m – 5:08.1 (1970)

References

1936 births
Living people
Soviet female speed skaters
Olympic speed skaters of the Soviet Union
Speed skaters at the 1964 Winter Olympics
Speed skaters at the 1968 Winter Olympics
Olympic bronze medalists for the Soviet Union
World record setters in speed skating
Olympic medalists in speed skating
Russian female speed skaters
Medalists at the 1964 Winter Olympics